"Temperature's Rising" is the third single from Mobb Deep's second album, The Infamous. Produced by Q-Tip, the song features R&B singer Crystal Johnson and contains a sample of "Where There Is Love" by Patrice Rushen.

Background
The song was written in the form of a letter to an associate that is hiding from the police, who went by the name Killa Black, who was also the older brother of Havoc. Killa Black, according to Prodigy in his 2011 autobiography My Infamous Life: The Autobiography of Mobb Deep's Prodigy, murdered a man over Walkman speakers, and Havoc hid Killa Black's gun in his basket of clothes. In the song, the narrator reveals that he is covering up evidence of his imprisoned friend's criminal actions, and speaks of his paranoia, fearing that the police are closing in on him.

A few years after the song was released, Killa Black committed suicide, in his mother's bathroom, from a self-inflicted gunshot wound to the head after coming home for the murder that is mentioned in the song. After being released, Killa Black became a Muslim. Prior to his suicide, he had been committed to a psychiatric hospital.

The B-side is "Give Up the Goods (Just Step)".

There is a remix to the single, also produced by Q-Tip, that utilizes the same Patrice Rushen sample that is used on the album version. The original version of the song was produced by Mobb Deep.

Track listing
Side A
"Temperature's Rising" [Remix]
"Temperature's Rising" [LP Version]

Side B
"Give Up the Goods (Just Step)" [LP Version]
"Give Up the Goods (Just Step)" [Instrumental]

References

1995 singles
1995 songs
Mobb Deep songs
Gangsta rap songs
Song recordings produced by Q-Tip (musician)
Songs written by Patrice Rushen
Songs written by Q-Tip (musician)
Songs written by Havoc (musician)
Songs written by Prodigy (rapper)
Loud Records singles